Limnaecia is a genus of moths in the family Cosmopterigidae.

Species
Limnaecia acontophora 
Limnaecia adiacrita Turner, 1923
Limnaecia amblopa  
Limnaecia ancilla  
Limnaecia anisodesma Lower, 1904
Limnaecia anthophaga  
Limnaecia argophylla  
Limnaecia arsitricha  
Limnaecia asterodes  
Limnaecia audax  
Limnaecia auximena  
Limnaecia bilineata  
Limnaecia bisignis Meyrick, 1921
Limnaecia callicosma  
Limnaecia callimitris Meyrick, 1897
Limnaecia camptosema Meyrick, 1897
Limnaecia capsigera  
Limnaecia cassandra  
Limnaecia charactis Meyrick, 1897
Limnaecia chionospila Meyrick, 1897
Limnaecia chlorodeta  
Limnaecia chloronephes  
Limnaecia chromaturga (Meyrick, 1915)
Limnaecia chrysidota  
Limnaecia chrysonesa Meyrick, 1897
Limnaecia chrysothorax Meyrick, 1920
Limnaecia cirrhochrosta  
Limnaecia cirrhosema Turner, 1923
Limnaecia cirrhozona Turner, 1923
Limnaecia clinodesma  
Limnaecia combota  
Limnaecia compsasis  
Limnaecia conjuncta  
Limnaecia conspersa  
Limnaecia crocodelta  
Limnaecia crossomela Lower, 1908
†Limnaecia cuprella  
Limnaecia cybophora Meyrick, 1897
Limnaecia dasytricha Meyrick, 1917 
Limnaecia definitiva (T.P. Lucas, 1901)
Limnaecia effulgens  
Limnaecia elaphropa Turner, 1923
Limnaecia enclista  
Limnaecia ensigera  
Limnaecia epimictis Meyrick, 1897
Limnaecia eretmota  
Limnaecia eristica Meyrick, 1919
Limnaecia eugramma Lower, 1899
Limnaecia eumeristis  
Limnaecia explanata  
Limnaecia fuscipalpis  
Limnaecia hemidoma Meyrick, 1897
Limnaecia hemimitra Turner, 1923
Limnaecia heterozona Lower, 1904
Limnaecia ichnographa  
Limnaecia ida Lower, 1908
Limnaecia inconcinna  
Limnaecia iriastis Meyrick, 1897
Limnaecia isodesma Lower, 1904
Limnaecia isozona Meyrick, 1897
Limnaecia leptomeris Meyrick, 1897
Limnaecia leptozona Turner, 1923
Limnaecia leucomita Turner, 1923
Limnaecia loxoscia Lower, 1923
Limnaecia lubricata  
Limnaecia lunacrescens (T.P. Lucas, 1901)
Limnaecia magica  
Limnaecia magnifica  
Limnaecia megalochlamys  
Limnaecia melanoma (Lower, 1897)
Limnaecia melanosoma  
Limnaecia melileuca  
Limnaecia melliplanta  
Limnaecia mercuriella  
Limnaecia metacypha  
Limnaecia metallifera  
Limnaecia microglypta  
Limnaecia monoxantha (Meyrick, 1922)
Limnaecia nephelochalca  
Limnaecia neurogramma  
Limnaecia nigrispersa  
Limnaecia novalis Meyrick, 1920
Limnaecia ochrozona Meyrick, 1897
Limnaecia orbigera Turner, 1923
Limnaecia orthocentra  
Limnaecia orthochroa (Lower, 1899)
Limnaecia pallidula Turner, 1923
Limnaecia pamphaea  
Limnaecia parallelograpta  
Limnaecia peronodes  
Limnaecia perpusilla  
Limnaecia phaeopleura  
Limnaecia phragmitella Stainton, 1851
Limnaecia piperatella  
Limnaecia platychlora Meyrick, 1915
Limnaecia platyochra Turner, 1923
Limnaecia platyscia Turner, 1923
Limnaecia polyactis Meyrick, 1921
Limnaecia polycydista Turner, 1926
Limnaecia proclina  
Limnaecia psalidota  
Limnaecia pterolopha Meyrick, 1920
Limnaecia pycnogramma  
Limnaecia pycnosaris  
Limnaecia recidiva  
Limnaecia sarcanthes  
Limnaecia scaeosema  
Limnaecia scoliosema Meyrick, 1897
Limnaecia semisecta  
Limnaecia simplex  
Limnaecia stabilita  
Limnaecia stenosticha Turner, 1926
Limnaecia symplecta Turner, 1923
Limnaecia syntaracta Meyrick, 1897
Limnaecia tetramitra  
Limnaecia tetraplanetis Meyrick, 1897
Limnaecia thiosima  
Limnaecia triplaneta Meyrick, 1921
Limnaecia tripunctata  
Limnaecia trisema Meyrick, 1897
Limnaecia trissodelta  
Limnaecia trissodesma (Meyrick, 1887)
Limnaecia trixantha  
Limnaecia tyriarcha  
Limnaecia xanthopelta Lower, 1903
Limnaecia xanthopis Meyrick, 1920
Limnaecia xanthotyla  
Limnaecia xylinella Snellen, 1902  (from Java)
Limnaecia zonomacula Lower, 1908
Limnaecia zotica Meyrick, 1921

L. astathopis probably belongs in Asymphorodes.

References
Natural History Museum Lepidoptera genus database

 
Moth genera
Taxa named by Henry Tibbats Stainton